Kurtis el Khaleel (born Graham Curtis el Khaleel, September 4, 1965), known by the stage name Kurtis Mantronik, is a Jamaican-born hip hop and electronic-music artist, DJ, remixer, and producer. He was the leader, DJ, and keyboardist of the influential 1980s hip hop and electro-funk group Mantronix. He currently lives in South Africa  where he has produced and remixed house and techno music tracks by artists such as India, Junior Senior, Kylie Minogue, Fatboy Slim, The Chemical Brothers, Michael Gray, Victoria Beckham, Liberty X, and Mim. Mantronik was influential in the development of hip hop music: notably, he laid the foundations for Southern hip hop genres such as Miami bass and trap music, and helped popularize the Amen break.

Early years and Mantronix era (1984–1991)

Mantronik was born in Jamaica to a Syrian father and a Jamaican mother. He emigrated to Sherwood Park, Alberta Canada with his family at the age of 7, before eventually settling in New York City. It was around this time that his interest in electro music began when he heard "Riot in Lagos" (1980) by Yellow Magic Orchestra's Ryuichi Sakamoto on the radio, inspiring him to experiment with electro music a few years later.

While working as the in-store DJ for Downtown Records in Manhattan, Mantronik met Jamaica-born, Brooklyn-based emcee MC Tee (né Touré Embden) in 1984. The duo soon made a demo, and eventually signed with William Socolov's Sleeping Bag Records.

Mantronix: The Album
Mantronix's debut single, "Fresh Is The Word", was a club hit in 1985, reaching No. 16 on Billboard magazine's Hot Dance Singles Sales chart, and was featured on Mantronix: The Album, which was released the same year. Mantronik's efforts on The Album and his impact on early hip-hop and electronic music is perhaps best summed up by music critic Omar Willey's observation in 2000:

Music Madness
Mantronix's second album, Music Madness, was released in 1986. While MC Tee's rhyming style on the album continued in the traditional b-boy fashion of the times, Mantronik's club-oriented production and mixing in Music Madness tended to attract more electronic dance music and electro-funk aficionados than hardcore hip hop fans.

A&R career with Sleeping Bag Records
From 1984 to 1986, during the same period Mantronix as a group was signed to Sleeping Bag Records, Mantronik was also individually employed by the label in its A&R Department, where he signed hip-hop group EPMD to its first recording contract with sister label Fresh Records. In addition to being an A&R representative for the label, Mantronik also produced recordings for other Sleeping Bag and Fresh Records associated artists and groups, including emcees KRS-One, Just-Ice, and T La Rock; freestyle vocalist Nocera; and R&B singer-songwriter Joyce Sims. During this time he remixed "Vertigo (Do The Demolition)" for Duran Duran, which was released on their 1987 US album Master Mixes.

The origins of trap music's beats have been traced back to the work of Kurtis Mantronik during this era. The earliest song to be identified as an early form of trap music is Mantronik's single "Bass Machine" (1986), featuring rap vocals by T La Rock. Mantronik's backing track for the song featured key trap elements, including Roland TR-808 bass, hi-hats, triplet snares and pitching down. Mantronik's work, particularly "Bass Machine" (1986), was also pivotal to the development of Southern hip hop's Miami bass genre.

In Full Effect
Mantronix signed with Capitol/EMI Records in 1987, and released In Full Effect in 1988, which continued in and expanded on the hip-hop/electro funk/dance music vein of its predecessor, eventually reaching No. 18 on the Top R&B/Hip-Hop Albums chart, Mantronix's highest showing for an album. In Full Effect marked the last Mantronix album with emcee MC Tee, who left the group to enlist in the United States Air Force.

Mantronik's 1988 track "King of the Beats" was one of the first songs to sample the Amen break. "King of the Beats" itself became one of the most sampled songs in music history, having been sampled more than 200 times, rivaling that of "Amen, Brother" itself.

This Should Move Ya
Following the departure of MC Tee, emcee Bryce "Luvah" Wilson and Mantronik's cousin DJD joined Mantronix for 1990's This Should Move Ya. Mantronik met Wilson, a fellow Sleeping Bag Records label mate, while doing production for Wilson's aborted solo project.

The album spawned two top-10 hits on the British singles chart, "Got to Have Your Love" at No. 4, and "Take Your Time" (featuring vocalist Wondress) at No. 10. In the United States, the album reached No. 61 on the Top R&B/Hip-Hop Albums chart. In a 1991 interview, Mantronik commented on the commercial success of "Got to Have Your Love":

The Incredible Sound Machine
Mantronix's final release, with vocalist Jade Trini replacing D.J. D, was The Incredible Sound Machine in 1991, which favored R&B, new jack swing, and dance music over hip hop. It was considered both a critical and commercial disappointment. The group disbanded shortly after a European tour and promotion related to the release of the album, and Mantronik left the music industry altogether for seven years.

Solo career (1998–present) 
Mantronik dropped out of the music industry after the breakup of Mantronix in 1991. According to a July 2002 interview with Hip Hop Connection magazine:

I Sing The Body Electro 
Mantronik moved from New York to the UK in early 2000s, after releasing his well-received solo album, I Sing the Body Electro (which featured female MC Traylude), in 1998, on New York indie Oxygen Music Works.

Allmusic critic John Bush noted:

Journey to Utopia 
Mantronik was most recently signed to London-based record label Street DNA, a sister label of the StreetSounds label, which released his newest studio album, Journey to Utopia, in late 2014.

The somewhat reclusive Mantronik opened Facebook, Twitter, and SoundCloud pages in connection with the promotion of the album.

Remixing and production career 
Since 1998, Mantronik has produced and remixed tracks for pop, electronic dance music artists and groups such as Kylie Minogue, Junior Senior, Fatboy Slim, The Chemical Brothers, Victoria Beckham, Michael Gray, Liberty X (which, in 2002, covered Mantronix's "Got to Have Your Love" from Mantronix's 1990 This Should Move Ya album), and Mim (the featured vocalist on Mantronik's 2003 EP release How Did You Know). He remixed classical composer Steve Reich's Drumming for release on the Reich Remixed album in 1999, and he was enlisted for two remixes of the title track of the Shirley Bassey remix album Diamonds Are Forever in 2000.

In addition to record production, Mantronik produced music for the Dance Dance Revolution and TrickStyle video game series.

Mantronik remains active in pop oriented electronic music, such as house music and big beat.

Discography

Solo albums

Solo EPs/Singles

Mantronix albums (1985–1991)

References

External links
 Official Web Site
 [ AllMusic.com Biography—Kurtis Mantronik]
 The King of the Beats: Kurtis Mantronik—Fan Site

1965 births
Living people
Jamaican people of Syrian descent
Video game musicians
Hip hop record producers
Mantronix members
Jamaican hip hop DJs
Musicians from London
Musicians from New York City
Remixers
Big beat musicians